New Zealand competed at the 2019 World Athletics Championships in Doha, Qatar, from 27 September to 6 October 2019.

Medalists

Results

Men
Track and road events

Field events

Women
Track and road events

Field events

References

Nations at the 2019 World Athletics Championships
World Championships in Athletics
New Zealand at the World Championships in Athletics